Giacomo Castelvetro (25 March 1546 – 21 March 1616) was an Italian expatriate in Europe and England, humanist, teacher and travel writer.

Life
Giacomo Castelvetro was born in Modena in 1546 to the banker Niccolò Castelvetro and his wife Liberata Tassoni. Not much is known of his early life. He was smuggled out of Modena with his older brother when he was eighteen years old. He stayed in Geneva with his uncle, the humanist critic, Ludovico Castelvetro. He traveled widely for several years, living in the towns of Lyon and Basel before his uncle died. In 1587 in Basel he married Isotta de Canonici, the widow of Thomas Erastus. In 1613 he was living at Charlton House the home of Adam Newton, tutor to Prince Henry. He died impoverished on 21 March 1616 after a long illness.

Protestantism
Having become a Protestant he feared for his life when he returned to Italy in 1578 after the death of his father. He swiftly went to England in 1580 after selling his property. From 1598 he settled in Venice. It was there that his brother Lelio was burnt at the stake as a heretic in 1609. In 1611 he was imprisoned by the inquisition but was rescued by the English ambassador Sir Dudley Carleton who threatened a diplomatic incident if an execution of a servant of the king was authorised. He went back to England to escape "the furious bite of the cruel and pitiless Roman inquisition".

Travels
In 1574 he befriended Sir Roger North of Kirtling on a 1574 visit to England and accompanied his son John on an educational tour in Italy. He was known to travel frequently to Europe after settling in England. He attended the renowned book fairs at Basel and Frankfurt. In 1592 he travelled to Scotland where his wife Isotta died. He then went to Denmark and Sweden. In Sweden he acquainted himself with Duke Charles who later became king in 1599. He toured Europe in 1598, visiting France, Switzerland and Germany. He set off on another European tour in search of patronage in 1611 after being freed from the Inquisition.

Patronage and tutorship
In England he received the patronage of Sir Philip Sidney, Sir Francis Walsingham and Sir Christopher Hatton when he became interested in publishing Renaissance works. He was closely involved with the English embassy in Venice and became friends with Sir Henry Wotton who was ambassador there before Sir Dudley Carleton.

In 1592 he was appointed Italian tutor and secretary to King James VI of Scotland and Anne of Denmark. King James later mentioned to the Venetian ambassador Antonio Foscarini that Castelvetro had served him in Scotland for a few years and was well-liked. He gave James VI a manuscript of his works in August 1592, and another manuscript to the Danish ambassador, Niels Krag in 1593, seeking Danish royal patronage.  

He taught Italian at the University of Cambridge for the Spring term in 1613; those he taught included George Stanhope. He is considered to be the most important promoter of the Italian language and heritage after John Florio, the first known teacher of Italian at the University of Oxford.

Works
Explicatio gravissimae quaestionis utrum excommunicatio (1589)
Castelvetro edited this work of Thomas Erastus and published his collection of medical works (Varia Opuscula Medica) to which Castelvetro wrote the introduction in 1590. He paid for the publishing of Il pastor fido in England in 1591.

 After settling in Venice in 1598 he edited manuscripts on contemporary Italian poetry and fiction for a publisher called G.B Ciotto.
 The fruit, herbs & vegetables of Italy (1614)
He was apparently shocked by the English partiality for meat, lack of green vegetables and sugar-rich diet. Thus he set about writing The fruit, herbs & vegetables of Italy (1614). The manuscript, written in Italian, was circulated amongst supporters. He was, like many Italians, a keen gardener. At the time in which he was writing the British palate was only beginning to absorb culinary flavours from the continent. Aspects of French and Dutch cooking had assimilated into British cooking but eating habits were still centred on the consumption of large quantities of meat. Castelvetro's enthusiasm for a diverse diet preceded John Evelyn's treatise produced in 1699 which equally urged the English to eat more salad vegetables.

The treatise is a valuable historical source on 17th century Italian society. It is interspersed with minute observations and vignettes from his life in Modena and Venice. He mentions children learning to swim in the Brenta whilst attached to huge pumpkins as a means to stay afloat; German wenches, Venetian ladies and intimate conversations with Scandinavian royalty.

He wrote the work at Charlton, and dedicated the work to Lucy, Countess of Bedford on the request of her brother John Harington and on the hope of acquiring future patronage but was unfortunate in this enterprise.

 He later edited a manuscript of Taddeo Duni of Zurich and translated A Remonstrance of James I … for the Right of Kings (1615) but didn't receive the royal patronage he desired.

Bibliography
 --, Gillian Riley, editor and translator, The fruit, herbs & vegetables of Italy, translation of Brieve racconto di tutte le radici, di tutte l'erbe e di tutti i frutti che crudi o cotti in Italia si mangiano (1614)

Notes

References

External links
 Extract. Giacomo Castelvetro on the Preparation of Broad Beans
 Manuscript by Giacomo Castelvetro written in Edinburgh for Niels Krag, 'Il Significato D'Alquanti belli et vari proverbi dell'Italica Favella'.
 Three manuscripts of A brief account of the Fruit, Herbs & Vegetables of Italy at Trinity College, Cambridge.
 Portrait by Ercole dell' Abbate (1587)

1546 births
1616 deaths
Writers from Modena
Italian Renaissance humanists
Italian Protestants
Victims of the Inquisition
Academics of the University of Cambridge